Ethmia apispinata is a moth in the family Depressariidae. It was described by Wang and Wang in 2012. It is found in China (Yunnan).

References

Moths described in 2012
apispinata